Horta Van Hoye (born 26 December 1946) is a Belgian gymnast. She competed in five events at the 1968 Summer Olympics.

References

External links
 

1946 births
Living people
Belgian female artistic gymnasts
Olympic gymnasts of Belgium
Gymnasts at the 1968 Summer Olympics
People from Oud-Heverlee
Sportspeople from Flemish Brabant